The men's 3000 metres steeplechase event at the 1988 World Junior Championships in Athletics was held in Sudbury, Ontario, Canada, at Laurentian University Stadium on 29 and 31 July.

Medalists

Results

Final
31 July

Heats
29 July

Heat 1

Heat 2

Heat 3

Participation
According to an unofficial count, 33 athletes from 24 countries participated in the event.

References

3000 metres steeplechasechase
Steeplechase at the World Athletics U20 Championships